David R. Reuben (born November 29, 1933) is a psychiatrist, and author. He is most famous for his book Everything You Always Wanted to Know About Sex* (*But Were Afraid to Ask).

Early life
Reuben was born in Chicago, and entered the University of Chicago, at 15. Reuben was graduated from University of Illinois College of Medicine, at 25. He had only one year of a psychiatric residency, and no record of further training or specialty certification.

Career
He worked at Cook County Hospital, then the United States Air Force, then opened a clinic in La Presa, California.  He let his California license lapse in 1976.

Reuben was a frequent guest on The Tonight Show with Johnny Carson. Jack Benny's "Everything you always wanted to know about Jack Benny, but were afraid to ask" featured Reuben.

The National Academy of Sciences filed a $35-million libel suit against Ruben.

Works
He changed his name, from Rubin to Reuben. shortly before writing Everything, published in 1969. That book inspired a film by Woody Allen, Everything You Always Wanted to Know About Sex* (*But Were Afraid to Ask) (1972).

Reuben also authored other books about sex, such as Any Woman Can! and How to Get More out of Sex, as well as about diet and nutrition.  These books suggest we should live by these three principles: Eat no refined sugar, eat no white flour, and do not take vitamin pills or other supplements. His book The Save Your Life Diet, promoted a high-fiber diet. Reuben suggested that a healthy diet involved the intake of natural fiber and reduction of cholesterol.

He also authored The Save Your Life Diet High-Fiber Cookbook, and Everything You Always Wanted to Know About Nutrition. The last book was written in the same style as his famous book Everything You Always Wanted to Know About Sex.

Personal life
In 1999, Reuben and his wife Barbara lived in Costa Rica. In 1999, they were married for 37 years and had five children.

References

External links
CNN article about Reuben from 1999

1933 births
Living people
American relationships and sexuality writers
American male non-fiction writers
Diet food advocates
High-fiber diet advocates